Kieran Baskett (born September 27, 2001) is a Canadian soccer player who plays for Pacific FC in the Canadian Premier League.

Career

College
Baskett began attending the College of William & Mary in 2019, playing for the men's soccer team. In his freshman season, he started all 18 of his team's matches, playing every minute and leading the Colonial Athletic Association conference in saves with 71.

Club
On January 13, 2021 Canadian Premier League club HFX Wanderers announced they had signed Baskett to a contract for 2021, with a club option for 2022. He made his first-team debut for the Wanderers on August 17, starting in goal against Blainville in a Canadian Championship match. In December 2021, Baskett would re-sign with HFX Wanderers for the 2022 season, with a club option for 2023. It was also announced that he would spend the off-season training with Championship side Coventry City. After the 2022 CPL season, HFX announced that Baskett's contract option was declined.

In March 2023, he signed with Pacific FC in the Canadian Premier League.

International
In 2016 Baskett was called up to a U15 identification camp with Canada. In 2017 Baskett represented Nova Scotia at the 2017 Canada Games.

Personal life
Baskett's mother, Gillian Hamilton, competed for Canada in the biathlon at the 1994 Winter Olympics.

References

External links

2001 births
Living people
Canadian soccer players
Association football goalkeepers
Soccer people from Nova Scotia
Sportspeople from Halifax, Nova Scotia
Soccer players from Baltimore
Canadian expatriate sportspeople in the United States
Canadian expatriate soccer players
Expatriate soccer players in the United States
William & Mary Tribe men's soccer players
HFX Wanderers FC players
Canadian Premier League players
Pacific FC players